A bacillus, also called a bacilliform bacterium or often just a rod (when the context makes the sense clear), is a rod-shaped bacterium or archaeon. Bacilli are found in many different taxonomic groups of bacteria. However, the name Bacillus, capitalized and italicized, refers to a specific genus of bacteria. The name Bacilli, capitalized but not italicized, can also refer to a less specific taxonomic group of bacteria that includes two orders, one of which contains the genus Bacillus. When the word is formatted with lowercase and not italicized, 'bacillus', it will most likely be referring to shape and not to the genus at all. Bacilliform bacteria are also often simply called rods when the bacteriologic context is clear.

Bacilli usually divide in the same plane and are solitary, but can combine to form diplobacilli, streptobacilli, and palisades.
 Diplobacilli: Two bacilli arranged side by side with each other.
 Streptobacilli: Bacilli arranged in chains.
 Coccobacillus: Oval and similar to coccus (circular shaped bacterium).

There is no connection between the shape of a bacterium and its color upon Gram staining; there are both gram-positive rods and gram-negative rods. MacConkey agar can be used to distinguish among gram-negative bacilli such as E. coli and salmonella.

Gram-positive examples
 Actinomyces
 Bacillus
 Clostridium
 Corynebacterium
 Listeria
 Propionibacterium

Gram-negative examples
 Bacteroides
 Citrobacter
 Enterobacter
 Escherichia
 Klebsiella
 Pseudomonas
 Proteus
 Salmonella
 Serratia
 Shigella
 Vibrio
 Yersinia

Bacteria